Adama Kéïta (born 3 May 1990) is a Malian professional footballer who plays as a goalkeeper for Guinée Championnat National club CI Kamsar and the Mali national team.

International career 
Kéïta's only match for Mali came on 6 August 2017, when he played in a 1–1 friendly draw against Senegal.

Honours 
CO Bamako
 Malian Cup: 2011
 Super Coupe National du Mali: 2011

Notes

References

External links 
 
 

1990 births
Living people
Malian footballers
Association football goalkeepers
Sportspeople from Bamako
Djoliba AC players
Malian Première Division players
Guinée Championnat National players
Mali international footballers
Malian expatriate footballers
Expatriate footballers in Guinea
Malian expatriate sportspeople in Guinea
CI Kamsar players
21st-century Malian people